Major General Clayton Lawrence Bissell (July 29, 1893 – December 24, 1972) was an air officer in the United States Army and United States Army Air Forces during World War I and World War II.

World War I service

Bissell graduated from Valparaiso University, Indiana, in 1917 with a degree of doctor of laws. He enlisted in the Aviation Section, Signal Reserve, August 15, 1917, and was commissioned a first lieutenant in the Aviation Section, Signal Reserve, January 12, 1918.

He began his aviation training at Mohawk, Canada, in September 1917, and was subsequently stationed at Taliaferro Field, Texas, from November 1917 to January 1918.

He sailed for England with the 22nd Aero Squadron, and received additional flying training at Salisbury Plain in England and aerial gunnery training in Scotland. He served in the Overseas Ferry Service before he was ordered to duty at the front with the 148th Aero Squadron in July 1918. He served with that unit and with the 41st Aero Squadron until the armistice. He was credited officially with destroying five enemy planes and driving one down out of control; these six victories qualify him as an ace. He commanded the 638th Aero Squadron with the American Forces in Germany until May 1919, when he returned to the United States.

The interwar years

His first assignment in the United States was Kelly Field, Texas, where he organized and commanded the 27th Aero Squadron. He was promoted to captain (temporary) March 11, 1919. In January 1920, he became education and recreation officer at Kelly Field, and commanded the Air Service Group.

He was ordered to Washington, D.C., in June 1920, for service as chief of the Tactical Operations Section in the office of Air Service. He was commissioned a first lieutenant in the Air Service, Regular Army, July 1, 1920. In December 1920, he went to Langley Field, Virginia, where he graduated from the Air Service Field Officers School in June 1921. He then remained at Langley Field as flight commander of the 14th Bombardment Squadron, and later became an instructor in the Air Corps Tactical School.

In November 1921, he was ordered to Washington for duty in the office of the Chief of the Air Service, as assistant to Brigadier General William Mitchell, serving in that capacity for four years. During this tour of duty, he was one of the pilots involved in the controversial Ostfriesland bombing that was the crux of Mitchell's court-martial.

In January 1924, he was detailed as advanced agent for the round-the-world flight in British Columbia, Alaska, the Aleutians, Greenland, Labrador, Newfoundland and the Maritime Provinces. On return to Washington, he was transferred to Langley Field in December 1924 to serve as secretary of the Air Service Board. Between October and December 1925, he served as assistant defense counsel for Mitchell during his court martial, under the direction of lead counsel Congressman Frank R. Reid.

He was an instructor at the Air Corps Tactical School at Langley Field, from September 1926 to August 1931, when he was assigned to the Command and General Staff School at Fort Leavenworth, Kansas, as a student. He graduated in June 1933, and two months later was assigned to the Army War College at Washington, D.C. He graduated in June 1934 and then entered the Chemical Warfare School at Edgewood Arsenal, Maryland. In July 1934, completing the course there a month later.

In October 1934, he was stationed at Schofield Barracks, Hawaii, as intelligence and operations officer of the 18th Pursuit Group, becoming commanding officer in October 1937. In July 1938, he went to the Naval War College at Newport, Rhode Island, and graduated in 1939. In July 1939, he became a member of the War Plans Division of the War Department General Staff at Washington, remaining on this duty until the beginning of World War II.

World War II

In January 1942, he was assigned as principal aviation officer on Major General Stilwell's staff in China; in August 1942 he was made commanding general of the 10th Air Force in India and Burma. He returned to the United States in August 1943.

A month later he became assistant chief of air staff for intelligence at Air Force Headquarters in Washington. In January 1944, he was assigned to the Office of the Assistant Chief of Staff for Intelligence on the War Department General Staff, and served in that capacity during the last two years of World War II. He was the Army member of Joint Security Control and on the Joint Intelligence Committee and the U.S. Army member of the Combined Intelligence Committee. He also served as the Army head of psychological warfare and as head of the War Department historical program.

Post World War II

In May 1946, he became military attaché to Great Britain, and in October 1948, returned to the United States, where he was assigned to the officers' pool at Bolling Air Force Base, D.C.

The following month he was transferred to Headquarters U.S. Air Forces in Europe, with station at Wiesbaden, Germany, where he remained until he returned to the United States in April 1950, for an assignment to Air Force headquarters in Washington, D.C. He retired in 1950 at the rank of Major General.

Controversies

Bissell taught at the Air Tactical School at the same time as did Claire Lee Chennault, later of the Flying Tigers. Bissell once tried to intimidate the Flying Tigers into staying in service by claiming that if they left, as soon as they got back to the United States they'd be drafted into the US Army as privates. The two men became personal enemies when Bissell continued to claim that fighters could not stop bombers from performing their mission. When Chennault was offered an appointment in the U.S. Army Air Corps as a brigadier general, he asked that he be granted a date of rank one day earlier than Bissell's and that was promised, but in the end, Bissell got one day of rank over Chennault. Throughout Bissell's tenure in India, Chennault complained of broken promises about planes, flyers, spare parts and supplies. To resolve the personal animosity, Stilwell ultimately agreed to have Bissell removed from the China Burma India Theater.

In his role as General George Marshall's assistant chief of staff for intelligence, he is known for having ordered the suppression of evidence that the Soviets were responsible for the Katyn massacre of Polish officers. While a prisoner of the Germans, U.S. Army Lieutenant Colonel  spent some time at the site of the Katyn massacre, and concluded from what he saw that the Soviets were responsible for the atrocity. On May 22, 1945, immediately upon his arrival in Washington, D.C., after being freed from captivity, Van Vliet filed a personal report with Bissell indicating what he had found. Bissell classified the report Top Secret in order to minimize its circulation, and later the report disappeared from archives.

Although Bissell claimed he had sent the report to the State Department, State said it never received it, and the Army had no receipt to show that it did. When called to account for his actions before a Congressional Committee investigating Katyn in February 1952, Bissell contended that he was merely carrying out the spirit of the Yalta Conference.
In 1950 Van Vliet recreated his wartime report  In 2014 a copy of Van Vliet's 1945 Paris disposition was discovered.

Decorations

See also

 List of World War I flying aces from the United States
 George Earle, author of another report on Katyn that was suppressed

References

Bibliography
 Above the Trenches: a Complete Record of the Fighter Aces and Units of the British Empire Air Forces 1915–1920. Christopher F. Shores, Norman L. R. Franks, Russell Guest. Grub Street, 1990. , .
 American Aces of World War I. Norman Franks, Harry Dempsey. Osprey Publishing, 2001. , .

External links
 

1893 births
1973 deaths
American World War I flying aces
United States Army personnel of World War I
United States Army personnel of World War II
Aviators from Pennsylvania
People from McKean County, Pennsylvania
Recipients of the Distinguished Flying Cross (United Kingdom)
Recipients of the Distinguished Flying Cross (United States)
Recipients of the Distinguished Service Cross (United States)
Recipients of the Distinguished Service Medal (US Army)
Recipients of the Silver Star
Recipients of the Air Medal
United States Army Command and General Staff College alumni
United States Air Force generals
Valparaiso University alumni
Air Corps Tactical School alumni
Burials at Arlington National Cemetery
Military personnel from Pennsylvania